Marcus Campbell is a Scottish snooker player.

Marcus Campbell may also refer to:
Marcus Beach Campbell (1866–1944), American judge
Marcus Campbell (basketball) (born 1982), American basketball player
 Marcus Campbell, the first playable character and unofficial protagonist in the video game State of Decay

See also
Marc Campbell (1884–1946), baseball player
Mark Campbell (disambiguation)